Bi is the second album by Athenian pop/electronica band Astyplaz.

Track listing

Hey
Bi-
I Can See You Fade
Zaira
No Sin No Shame (featuring Akis Boyatzis)
An Endless Rewind
Let's Get Rolling (Pop 'n' Roll)
Private Flight
Time (featuring Carbonated Lemonade)
116.99
A Moment To Say Goodbye
116.99 (Serafim Tsotsonis mix)

2008 albums
Astyplaz albums